Roane County is a county located in the U.S. state of West Virginia. As of the 2020 census, the population was 14,028. Its county seat is Spencer. The county was founded in 1856 and is named for Spencer Roane.

History
Roane County was created by an act of the Virginia General Assembly on March 11, 1856. It was named for the jurist Spencer Roane of Virginia.  He was born in Essex County April 4, 1762. The county's seat Spencer was also named for Judge Roane.

On June 20, 1863, at the height of the Civil War, Roane was one of fifty Virginia counties that were admitted to the Union as the state of West Virginia.  Later that year, the state's counties were divided into civil townships, with the intention of encouraging local government.  This proved impractical in the heavily rural state, and in 1872 the townships were converted into magisterial districts.  Roane County was divided into seven districts: Curtis, Geary, Harper, Reedy, Smithfield, Spencer, and Walton.  Except for minor adjustments, these districts were largely unchanged for more than a century, until in the 1980s they were consolidated into three new magisterial districts: Northern, Eastern, and Western.  A fourth district, Southern, was added in the 1990s.

Geography

Major highways
 Interstate 79
 U.S. Highway 33
 U.S. Highway 119
 West Virginia Route 14
 West Virginia Route 36

Adjacent counties
Wirt County (north)
Calhoun County (east)
Clay County (southeast)
Kanawha County (south)
Jackson County (west)

Demographics

2000 census
As of the census of 2000, there were 15,446 people, 6,161 households, and 4,479 families living in the county.  The population density was 32 people per square mile (12/km2).  There were 7,360 housing units at an average density of 15 per square mile (6/km2).  The racial makeup of the county was 98.56% White, 0.22% Black or African American, 0.21% Native American, 0.23% Asian, 0.19% from other races, and 0.60% from two or more races.  0.67% of the population were Hispanic or Latino of any race.

There were 6,161 households, out of which 30.70% had children under the age of 18 living with them, 59.10% were married couples living together, 9.30% had a female householder with no husband present, and 27.30% were non-families. 23.50% of all households were made up of individuals, and 11.90% had someone living alone who was 65 years of age or older.  The average household size was 2.49 and the average family size was 2.91.

In the county, the population was spread out, with 23.40% under the age of 18, 8.70% from 18 to 24, 26.60% from 25 to 44, 26.50% from 45 to 64, and 14.80% who were 65 years of age or older.  The median age was 40 years. For every 100 females there were 98.00 males.  For every 100 females age 18 and over, there were 96.00 males.

The median income for a household in the county was $24,511, and the median income for a family was $29,280. Males had a median income of $28,738 versus $17,207 for females. The per capita income for the county was $13,195.  About 17.80% of families and 22.60% of the population were below the poverty line, including 32.10% of those under age 18 and 15.50% of those age 65 or over.

2010 census
As of the 2010 United States census, there were 14,926 people, 6,195 households, and 4,193 families living in the county. The racial makeup of the county was 98.4% white, 0.3% Asian, 0.2% American Indian, 0.1% black or African American, 0.2% from other races, and 0.9% from two or more races. Those of Hispanic or Latino origin made up 0.7% of the population. In terms of ancestry, 20.7% were American, 17.9% were Irish, 15.3% were German, and 9.1% were English.

Of the 6,195 households, 28.9% had children under the age of 18 living with them, 53.2% were married couples living together, 9.9% had a female householder with no husband present, 32.3% were non-families, and 27.2% of all households were made up of individuals. The average household size was 2.39 and the average family size was 2.89. The median age was 43.5 years.

The median income for a household in the county was $27,428 and the median income for a family was $35,289. Males had a median income of $32,106 versus $22,914 for females. The per capita income for the county was $15,103. About 21.5% of families and 27.6% of the population were below the poverty line, including 41.5% of those under age 18 and 15.5% of those age 65 or over.

Politics

Communities

City
Spencer (county seat)

Town
Reedy

Magisterial districts

Current
Northern
Southern
Eastern
Western

Historic
Curtis
Geary
Harper
Reedy
Smithfield
Spencer
Walton

Unincorporated communities

Amma
Cotton
Elana
Gandeeville
Lattimer
Left Hand
Linden
Looneyville
Peniel
Walton
Newton

See also
National Register of Historic Places listings in Roane County, West Virginia

References

 
1856 establishments in Virginia
Populated places established in 1856
Counties of Appalachia